Raphael Cerrato is an American college baseball coach and former player. Cerrato is the head coach of the Rhode Island Rams baseball team.

Coaching career
Cerrate returned to the University of Rhode Island as a volunteer assistant in 1997. From 1998 to 2000, Cerrato was an assistant at the UMass Minutemen baseball program. Following his stint at UMass, Cerrato became the top assistant for the Brown Bears baseball team. In 2006, he became the top assistant for the University of New Haven, only to be promoted to head coach the next year. Cerrato lead the Chargers to a 131–97 record in 5 seasons as the head coach.

In 2012, he returned to Rhode Island to become an assistant for Jim Foster.

On July 17, 2014, Cerrato was named the interim head coach for the Rhode Island baseball team. After guiding the Rams to a 26–25–1 in 2015, Cerrato signed a 4-year contract to be the permanent head coach on July 23, 2015.

Head coaching record

See also
 List of current NCAA Division I baseball coaches

References

External links
Rhode Island Rams bio

Living people
1971 births
Rhode Island Rams baseball players
Rhode Island Rams baseball coaches
UMass Minutemen baseball coaches
Brown Bears baseball coaches
New Haven Chargers baseball coaches